Freakish is an American horror streaming television series that premiered on October 10, 2016, on Hulu. The series features several high-profile social-media stars and celebrities—including Liza Koshy, Hayes Grier, Meghan Rienks, Leo Howard, and Aislinn Paul—and focuses on a group of high-school students who are trapped inside their school when a nearby chemical plant explodes, resulting in residents and other infected students turning into mutated freaks. In July 2018, it was reported that the series had been cancelled after two seasons.

Premise
The series follows a group of students who gather for school detention on a Saturday at Kent High. Other students are on campus as well, but involved in various activities (basketball, debate prep, music, etc.). When a nearby chemical plant explodes, they must work together to find a way to survive with only limited resources and protect themselves from those who have turned into freakish zombie-like creatures as a result of the fallout.

Characters

Main
 Leo Howard as Grover Jones: a high school student who becomes a survivor at the high school after attending detention so that he can spend time with his crush, Violet Adams
 Liza Koshy as Violet Adams: a high school student who becomes a survivor in the school after getting detention for her lack of patience and tendency to lash out
 Adam Hicks as Diesel Turner: a high school student who becomes a survivor in the school after attending detention for bullying younger students
 Aislinn Paul as Natalie Callaway (season 1): a high school student who becomes a survivor in the school
 Meghan Rienks as Zoe Parker: a high school cheer captain who becomes a survivor in the school after attending detention
 Melvin Gregg as Lashawn Deveraux: a high school student who becomes a survivor in the school with his best friend, Noodle and girlfriend, Zoe
 Tyler Chase as Barrett McIntyre: a high school student who becomes a survivor in the school and has a talent for hacking and problem solving
 Hayes Grier as Noodle Nelson (season 1): Lashawn's best friend who becomes a survivor in the school after attending detention
 Niki DeMar as Sadie (season 2): a member of a secondary group of survivors who later find shelter at the school
 Saxon Sharbino as Anka Keller (season 2): a member of a secondary group of survivors who later find shelter at the school
 Jordan Calloway as Zane Hiatt (season 2): Violet's ex-boyfriend and a member of a secondary group of survivors who later find shelter at the school

Recurring
 Mary Mouser as Mary Jones (season 1)
 Alex Ozerov as Lyle (season 1)
 Chad L. Coleman as Coach (season 1)
Chad Michael Collins as John Collins (season 1)
Olivia Gonzales as Addy (season 1)
Amanda Steele as Hailey (season 2)
 Jake Busey as Earl (season 2)
Brant Daugherty as Jake (season 2)
 Tati Gabrielle as Birdie (season 2)
 Ryan McCartan as Oliver Keller (season 2)
 Joy Osmanski as Felicity (season 2)
 Arden Cho as Tonya (season 2)

Guest
 Caitlin Carver as Elise (season 2)
 Raushanah Simmons as Poe (season 2)

Episodes

Season 1 (2016)

Season 2 (2017)

Production
Freakish is produced by AwesomenessTV and was created by Beth Szymkowski. Hulu acquired exclusive streaming rights during production of the program. The show premiered on October 10, 2016.

Hulu renewed the series for a second season, which consisted of 10 episodes and premiered on October 18, 2017.

On July 27, 2018, it was reported that the series had been canceled due to low ratings.

Reception

Critical response
Sonia Saraiya writing for Variety called the show "a silly, lightweight half-hour, somewhere between horror thriller and teen soap" and ultimately said "The show never quite becomes interesting enough to transcend either the dully predictable beats of zombie horror or the plodding angst of young adulthood."

Neil Genzlinger for The New York Times said of the show "Here in the age of zombie TV, lots about 'Freakish' seems familiar, but with the episodes shorter than a half-hour each, the series goes down easily."

Emily Longeretta at Hollywoodlife.com described the show as "The Walking Dead meets The Breakfast Club."

On Rotten Tomatoes season 1 has 4 reviews, 3 were positive and 1 was negative.

Awards and nominations

References

External links
 
 

2010s American high school television series
2010s American horror television series
2016 American television series debuts
2017 American television series endings
American horror fiction television series
Awesomeness (company)
English-language television shows
Hulu original programming
Television series about teenagers
Zombies in television
Zombie web series